Masaru Inoue may refer to:

 Masaru Inoue (astronomer), an astronomer
 Inoue Masaru (bureaucrat) (1843–1910), Japanese engineer and bureaucrat, "Father of Japan's Railways"